Cantonale elections to renew canton general councillors were held in France on 25 September and 2 October 1988. Abstention exploded to 50.9% in the first round and 53% in the runoff, likely due to the election being the third held that here after the presidential and legislative elections. The right narrowly won, with 50.3% to 49.6% to the left. However, the status quo prevailed.

Electoral system

The cantonales elections use the same system as the regional or legislative elections. There is a 10% threshold (10% of registered voters) needed to proceed to the second round.

Change in control

From right to left

Gironde

From left to right

Alpes-de-Haute-Provence

National results

unavailable

Sources

Alain Lancelot, Les élections sous la Ve République, PUF, Paris, 1988

1988
1988 elections in France
September 1988 events in Europe
October 1988 events in Europe